Elections to Craigavon Borough Council were held on 5 May 2011 on the same day as the other Northern Irish local government elections. The election used four district electoral areas to elect a total of 26 councillors.

Election results

Note: "Votes" are the first preference votes.

Districts summary

|- class="unsortable" align="centre"
!rowspan=2 align="left"|Ward
! % 
!Cllrs
! % 
!Cllrs
! %
!Cllrs
! %
!Cllrs
! % 
!Cllrs
! %
!Cllrs
!rowspan=2|TotalCllrs
|- class="unsortable" align="center"
!colspan=2 bgcolor="" | DUP
!colspan=2 bgcolor="" | Sinn Féin
!colspan=2 bgcolor="" | UUP
!colspan=2 bgcolor="" | SDLP
!colspan=2 bgcolor="" | Alliance
!colspan=2 bgcolor="white"| Others
|-
|align="left"|Craigavon Central
|bgcolor="#D46A4C"|28.8
|bgcolor="#D46A4C"|2
|24.7
|2
|24.7
|2
|4.4
|0
|6.7
|1
|10.7
|0
|7
|-
|align="left"|Loughside
|6.5
|0
|bgcolor="#008800"|60.0
|bgcolor="#008800"|3
|0.0
|0
|30.5
|2
|0.0
|0
|3.0
|0
|5
|-
|align="left"|Lurgan
|bgcolor="#D46A4C"|37.4
|bgcolor="#D46A4C"|3
|9.8
|1
|35.3
|3
|5.4
|0
|5.6
|0
|6.5
|0
|7
|-
|align="left"|Portadown
|bgcolor="#D46A4C"|46.2
|bgcolor="#D46A4C"|4
|22.6
|2
|17.1
|1
|11.1
|0
|0.0
|0
|3.0
|0
|7
|- class="unsortable" class="sortbottom" style="background:#C9C9C9"
|align="left"| Total
|30.0
|9
|27.9
|8
|20.6
|6
|12.1
|2
|3.4
|1
|6.0
|0
|26
|-
|}

District results

Craigavon Central

2005: 3 x DUP, 2 x UUP, 1 x Sinn Féin, 1 x SDLP
2011: 2 x DUP, 2 x UUP, 2 x Sinn Féin, 1 x Alliance
2005-2011 Change: Sinn Féin and Alliance gain from SDLP and DUP

Loughside

2005: 3 x Sinn Féin, 2 x SDLP
2011: 3 x Sinn Féin, 2 x SDLP
2005-2011 Change: No change

Lurgan

2005: 3 x DUP, 3 x UUP, 1 x Sinn Féin
2011: 3 x DUP, 3 x UUP, 1 x Sinn Féin
2005-2011 Change: No change

Portadown

2005: 3 x DUP, 1 x Sinn Féin, 1 x UUP, 1 x SDLP, 1 x Independent
2011: 4 x DUP, 2 x Sinn Féin, 1 x UUP
2005-2011 Change: DUP and Sinn Féin gain from SDLP and Independent

References

Craigavon Borough Council elections
Craigavon